John Martino may refer to:

 John Martino (actor) (born 1937), American actor
 John Martino (writer) (1911–1975), American casino security systems technician jailed in Havana